KCFN (91.1 FM) is a radio station broadcasting a Conservative Christian radio format. Licensed to Wichita, Kansas, United States, the station serves the Wichita area. The station is owned by American Family Association and is an affiliate of American Family Radio.

History
The station began broadcasting on April 23, 1978, holding the call sign KDSA, and was owned by the Defenders School of the Air. In 1981, the station was sold to Friends University for $100,000. Its call sign was changed to KSOF the following year. KSOF aired a classical music/fine arts format.

In 1992, the station was sold to New Life Fellowship for $205,000, and it adopted a Christian contemporary format. On June 15, 1992, its call sign was changed to KZZD and on July 12, 1993, its call sign was changed to KCFN. In 1994, the station was sold to American Family Association for $275,000, and it became an affiliate of American Family Radio.

References

External links

American Family Radio stations
Moody Radio affiliate stations
Radio stations established in 1978
CFN
1978 establishments in Kansas
Radio stations in Wichita, Kansas